Hieracium abscissum is a species of plant in the tribe Cichorieae within the family Asteraceae. It is considered to be native to the south-western United States (Arizona and New Mexico), Mexico and Central America.

One stalk branches toward the top, producing 5-60 flower heads. Each head has 20-24 yellow ray flowers but no disc flowers.

References

External links
Line drawing for Flora of Panamá
Photo of herbarium specimen collected in Nuevo León in 1992

abscissa
Flora of Central America
Flora of Mexico
Flora of the Southwestern United States
Plants described in 1830